The 1935–36 season was the 36th season of competitive football in Belgium. R Daring Club de Bruxelles won their 4th Premier Division title.

Overview
At the end of the season, RCS Brugeois and R Berchem Sport were relegated to Division I, while FC Turnhout (Division I A winner) and ARA La Gantoise (Division I B winner) were promoted to the Premier Division.
ARA Termondoise, Patria FC Tongres, AS Herstal and RCS Verviétois were relegated from Division I to Promotion, to be replaced by R Union Hutoise FC, OC Charleroi, R Stade Louvain and SC Eendracht Aalst.

National team

* Belgium score given first

Key
 H = Home match
 A = Away match
 N = On neutral ground
 F = Friendly
 o.g. = own goal

Honours

Final league tables

Premier Division

References
RSSSF archive – Final tables 1895–2002
Belgian clubs history
FA website